Butterfinger was a Saskatchewan-based Canadian alternative rock band which released one independently recorded studio album.

Their song Breathe won several awards including the national songwriting competition in conjunction with Canadian Music Week in 2001. Its success inspired the band to work on a full-length album, directed by Producer, Mixer, and Engineer Jared Kuemper.

Butterfinger was nominated for "Outstanding Rock Recording" at the Western Canadian Music Awards in 2003.

In November 2003, Butterfinger was awarded a VideoFACT grant to shoot a music video for the song Do You Feel?. They were one of only 40 to receive the grant out of the 284 submissions. The video was produced by a Toronto film company called Firewatch Films.

The band has not released any new music since 2004 (although it played the half-time show at the 2017 Saskatchewan Rush home opener game). Sanche left the music industry. Tupper has played in several bands including Hung Jury, Lisa Moen, and Tyler Lewis. Tyler Penny formed the band Penny Reign. Dean Person has had success as a singer/songwriter/guitarist.

Members
Dean Person - Lead Guitar, Vocals
Tyler Penny - Lead Vocals, Guitar
John Sanche - Bass, Vocals
Damon Tupper - Drums, Vocals

References

External links
 CDBaby album Listing
 Butterfinger fan site

Musical groups established in 2001
Musical groups disestablished in 2004
Musical groups from Saskatoon
Canadian alternative rock groups
2001 establishments in Saskatchewan
2004 disestablishments in Canada